The Royal School Cavan is a secondary school located in Cavan, County Cavan, Ireland. It was one of a number of 'free schools' created by James I in 1608 to provide an education to the sons of local merchants and farmers during the plantation of Ulster. It has four 'sister' schools: The Royal School, Armagh in Armagh, The Enniskillen Royal Grammar School in Enniskillen, County Fermanagh, The Royal and Prior School Raphoe in County Donegal, and The Royal School Dungannon in Dungannon, County Tyrone.

History
The Royal School Cavan was one of the five schools originally established as part of a plan to provide education for children of the settlers who had arrived with the Ulster Plantation. Although the school traces its origins to 1608, it experienced substantial challenges in its first three centuries of operation and was threatened with closure. However, with the appointment of John Anderson as headmaster in 1924, and subsequently his son Douglas Anderson (1970-1989), then Ivan Bolton (1989-2009) and Edward Lindsay (2009-) the school has steadily improved with new facilities and a steady increase in enrolment. A few months prior to the reopening of schools following the Covid-19 lockdown it was confirmed that the school would be suspending its boarding policy indefinitely - the first time this has happened in its over 400 year history - due to high cost and difficulty in maintaining social distancing measures.

Notable alumni and staff
 Thomas Sheridan - headmaster (1735-1738)

References

1608 establishments in Ireland
Educational institutions established in the 1600s
Cavan (town)
Boarding schools in Ireland
Schools with a royal charter